Amorbia concavana is a species of moth of the family Tortricidae. It is found from Panama to Mexico and on Cuba, where it is found at altitudes between 50 and 300 meters. It has recently found in the United States in southern Florida.

The length of the forewings is 7.5–8.6 mm. The ground color of the forewings is pale yellow with brownish marks in the median and postmedian area near the costa. The hindwing dorsal scaling is beige with a darker apex. Adults are on wing during both the dry and rainy seasons.

The larvae are polyphagous and have been reported feeding on Inga vera, Phaseolus species, Mimosa pigra and Hammelia species.

References

Moths described in 1877
Sparganothini
Moths of North America